In type theory, a system has inductive types if it has facilities for creating a new type from constants and functions that create terms of that type.  The feature serves a role similar to data structures in a programming language and allows a type theory to add concepts like numbers, relations, and trees.  As the name suggests, inductive types can be self-referential, but usually only in a way that permits structural recursion.

The standard example is encoding the natural numbers using Peano's encoding. It can be defined in Coq as follows:
 Inductive nat : Type :=
   | 0 : nat
   | S : nat -> nat.
Here, a natural number is created either from the constant "0" or by applying the function "S" to another natural number.  "S" is the successor function which represents adding 1 to a number.  Thus, "0" is zero, "S 0" is one, "S (S 0)" is two, "S (S (S 0))" is three, and so on.

Since their introduction, inductive types have been extended to encode more and more structures, while still being predicative and supporting structural recursion.

Elimination 

Inductive types usually come with a function to prove properties about them.  Thus, "nat" may come with (in Coq syntax):
 nat_elim : (forall P : nat -> Prop, (P 0) -> (forall n, P n -> P (S n)) -> (forall n, P n)).
In words: for any proposition "P" over natural numbers, given a proof of "P 0" and a proof of "P n -> P (n+1)", we get back a proof of "forall n, P n". This is the familiar induction principle for natural numbers.

Implementations

W- and M-types 

W-types are well-founded types in intuitionistic type theory (ITT). They generalize natural numbers, lists, binary trees, and other "tree-shaped" data types. Let  be a universe of types. Given a type  :  and a dependent family  :  → , one can form a W-type . The type  may be thought of as "labels" for the (potentially infinitely many) constructors of the inductive type being defined, whereas  indicates the (potentially infinite) arity of each constructor. W-types (resp. M-types) may also be understood as well-founded (resp. non-well-founded) trees with nodes labeled by elements  :  and where the node labeled by  has-many subtrees. Each W-type is isomorphic to the initial algebra of a so-called polynomial functor.

Let 0, 1, 2, etc. be finite types with inhabitants 11 : 1, 12, 22:2, etc. One may define the natural numbers as the W-type

with  : 2 →  is defined by (12) = 0 (representing the constructor for zero, which takes no arguments), and (22) = 1 (representing the successor function, which takes one argument).

One may define lists over a type  :  as  where

and 11 is the sole inhabitant of 1. The value of  corresponds to the constructor for the empty list, whereas the value of  corresponds to the constructor that appends  to the beginning of another list.

The constructor for elements of a generic W-type  has type

We can also write this rule in the style of a natural deduction proof,

The elimination rule for W-types works similarly to structural induction on trees. If, whenever a property (under the propositions-as-types interpretation)  holds for all subtrees of a given tree it also holds for that tree, then it holds for all trees.

In extensional type theories, W-types (resp. M-types) can be defined up to isomorphism as initial algebras (resp. final coalgebras) for polynomial functors. In this case, the property of initiality (res. finality) corresponds directly to the appropriate induction principle. In intensional type theories with the univalence axiom, this correspondence holds up to homotopy (propositional equality).

M-types are dual to W-types, they represent coinductive (potentially infinite) data such as streams. M-types can be derived from W-types.

Mutually inductive definitions 

This technique allows some definitions of multiple types that depend on each other. For example, defining two parity predicates on natural numbers using two mutually inductive types in Coq:

Inductive even : nat -> Prop :=
  | zero_is_even : even O
  | S_of_odd_is_even : (forall n:nat, odd n -> even (S n))
with odd : nat -> Prop :=
  | S_of_even_is_odd : (forall n:nat, even n -> odd (S n)).

Induction-recursion 

Induction-recursion started as a study into the limits of ITT.  Once found, the limits were turned into rules that allowed defining new inductive types.  These types could depend upon a function and the function on the type, as long as both were defined simultaneously.

Universe types can be defined using induction-recursion.

Induction-induction 

Induction-induction allows definition of a type and a family of types at the same time.  So, a type  and a family of types .

Higher inductive types 

This is a current research area in Homotopy Type Theory (HoTT).  HoTT differs from ITT by its identity type (equality).  Higher inductive types not only define a new type with constants and functions that create elements of the type, but also new instances of the identity type that relate them.

A simple example is the  type, which is defined with two constructors, a basepoint;

and a loop;

The existence of a new constructor for the identity type makes  a higher inductive type.

See also 
 Coinduction permits (effectively) infinite structures in type theory.

References

External links 
 Induction-Recursion Slides
 Induction-Induction Slides
 Higher Inductive Types: a tour of the menagerie

Type theory